'Bamburi, from the local bantu words "Ba" (People) and "Mburi" (Goat), is a commercial, industrial and local electoral, administrative and a tourist and residential area on the Kenyan north-coast which extends from the coastline on the Indian ocean to the surrounding middle and low-income settlements on the mainland. Administratively, Bamburi is in the Kisauni sub-county of Mombasa and has tourist and beach-front facilities, which include international and local hotels and parks such as Serena International Beach Hotel, Sai Rock Hotel, Kahamas Hotel, Haller Park and Butterfly Pavilion. Bamburi Cement Ltd, a major cement quarry and factory, is also situated in the area and is one of the iconic enterprises. The most popular residential estates within Bamburi include Kiembeni Estate, Nairobi Estate and Bamburi Mwisho. It is a cultural melting pot, with a pulsating night life, especially the area between Front Line and the Bamburi Cement Ltd factory, populated by a line of clubs, sports pubs, eateries and small businesses.

Haller Park 

In 1971, Rene Haller transformed parts of the cement and quarry complex into a nature reserve which was eventually named after him. The 11 km2 area holds a variety of native game, and (prior to 2007) the highly covered attraction of Owen and Mzee – the friendship of a hippopotamus and a tortoise.

Transport 
Bamburi is reached by bus or matatu from Mombasa island en route to Mtwapa or Malindi. Terminal matatus serve the Bamburi Cement complex.

References 

Mombasa
Mombasa County
Populated places in Coast Province